Władysław Olearczyk (8 June 1898 – 21 February 1970) was a Polish footballer. He played in four matches for the Poland national football team from 1923 to 1925.

References

External links
 

1898 births
1970 deaths
Polish footballers
Poland international footballers
Place of birth missing
Association footballers not categorized by position